Drew House may refer to:

Buildings 
In the United States (by state then city):
Julian-Drew Building, Tucson, Arizona, listed on the National Register of Historic Places in Pima County
Schindhelm-Drews House, Iowa City, Iowa, listed on the National Register of Historic Places in Johnson County
Holland-Drew House, Lewiston, Maine, listed on the NRHP in Androscoggin County
Elvira Drew Three-Decker, Worcester, Massachusetts, a house listed on the NRHP in Worcester County 
Charles Richard Drew House, Arlington, Virginia, listed on the NRHP in Arlington County

Other uses 
 A clothing line launched by Canadian singer Justin Bieber